The Magic Wardrobe is a 2011 Icelandic family film directed by Bragi Hinriksson.

Cast
 Vilhelm Anton Jónsson as Villi
 Guðjón Davíð Karlsson as Gói
 Sverrir Þór Sverrisson as Sveppi

References

External links
 

2011 films
2011 drama films
2010s Icelandic-language films
Icelandic drama films